Hermann Haller (15 December 1909 – 21 June 1985) was a Swiss film editor. He also directed four films.

Selected filmography
Editor
 The Theft of the Mona Lisa (1931)
 The Rebel (1932)
 The Castle in the South (1933)
 Dream Castle (1933)
 Song of Farewell (1934)
 Spring Parade (1934)
 Farewell Waltz (1934)
 Hearts are Trumps (1934)
 Stradivari (1935)
 Stradivarius (1935)
  Winter Night's Dream (1935)
 Variety (1935)
 Harvest (1936)
 Lumpaci the Vagabond (1936)
 The Castle in Flanders (1936)
 The Charm of La Boheme (1937)
 Premiere (1937)
 Fusilier Wipf (1938)
 Mirror of Life (1938)
 Gilberte de Courgenay (1942)
 Johann (1943)
 Marie-Louise (1944)
 Madness Rules (1947)
 The Search (1948)
 After the Storm (1948)
 A Kingdom for a Horse (1949)
 Palace Hotel (1952)
 Heidi (1952)
 Heidi and Peter (1955)
 The Man Who Walked Through the Wall (1959)
 Peter Voss, Hero of the Day (1959)
 The Juvenile Judge (1960)
 Yes, Women are Dangerous (1960)
 Grounds for Divorce (1960)
 The Good Soldier Schweik (1960)
 The Marriage of Mr. Mississippi (1961)
 The Liar (1961)
 Jakobli and Meyeli (1962)
 Snow White and the Seven Jugglers (1962)
  (1962)
 Rampage at Apache Wells (1965)
 The Last Tomahawk (1965)
 The Doctor Speaks Out (1966)
 The Valley of Death (1968)
 Death in the Red Jaguar (1968)
 Death and Diamonds (1968)
 Helgalein (1969)
  We'll Take Care of the Teachers (1970)

External links

1909 births
1985 deaths
Swiss film directors
Swiss film editors
German-language film directors
Film people from Zürich